Glenbrook is a township of the Lower Blue Mountains of New South Wales, Australia. It is located 63 kilometres west of Sydney in the local government area of the City of Blue Mountains. At the 2016 Australian census Glenbrook had a population of 5,051 people.

Glenbrook lies between Lapstone and Blaxland at an elevation of 163 m (535 ft) and is approximately a 50-minute drive from Sydney. It plays host to trendy cafes and boutiques, while offering various tourist attractions, including weekend markets, recreational opportunities and native flora and fauna.

The town takes its name from Glenbrook Creek, which is on the southern side of the village and must be crossed to enter the Blue Mountains National Park. Glenbrook retains many historical homes and buildings throughout the village, although most homes are occupied and not open to the public.

History
Blaxland, Wentworth and Lawson reached Glenbrook area and Lagoon on their trek across the Blue Mountains on 12 May 1813 and described it as "a large lagoon of good water full of very coarse rushes".

In 1815, William Cox constructed the first road over the Blue Mountains with a gang of convicts and the Glenbrook area became an important stopping point after a storeroom was built near the lagoon. Governor Macquarie also built a military depot near the lagoon to monitor traffic on the newly built road.

After years of use, Cox's road up Lapstone Hill ran into a few problems. It was very steep in sections and in rain became slippery. A new road and stone bridge was built and opened to traffic in 1833 "The Western Road", at what is today Mitchell's Pass, planned and built by Thomas Livingstone Mitchell. The Stone Bridge, Lennox Bridge completed in 1833 and designed by Scottish stonemason David Lennox is the oldest surviving stone bridge on the Australian mainland.

Glenbrook became a town in the 1870s as a result of the arrival of the railway. In 1867 a zigzag railway was built up the Lapstone Hill and on to Weatherboard "Wentworth Falls". A siding was also built at Glenbrook "Wascoe's Siding", named after an Inn from the local area, water from Glenbrook Lagoon was piped to supply the trains after traversing the Lapstone ZigZag. This Wascoe Siding became a passenger station in 1877. In 1878, Sir Alfred Stephen, Chief Justice and Privy Councillor, decided to give the station a proper name and called it Brookdale, but later it was officially changed to Glenbrook in 1879, named after the nearby creek and Gorge. Glenbrook, which Sir John Jamison thought came from Regents Glen. A village sprung up near the station and was officially proclaimed Glenbrook, six years later.

The Lapstone ZigZag opened in 1867, a part of the ascent of Lapstone Hill on a gradient of 1 in 30–33, which was built up the side of the range with comparatively light earthwork, although it includes the substantial seven-span sandstone Knapsack Viaduct. This was later widened to carry the old Great Western Highway, and it is now part of a walking trail on the old railway/highway alignment, including a memorial to the engineer in charge of the construction of the Blue Mountains line and many other early railways, John Whitton.

In 1892 the first deviation of the railway up the Lapstone Hill, bypassed the Lapstone Zig Zag altogether. A tunnel was built through the hill to the Old Glenbrook station (subsequently dismantled). The 1892 Glenbrook Tunnel ran into trouble with water seeping from the nearby creek and the steep gradient making the climb hard for most trains, often getting stuck in the tunnel.

In 1913 the second deviation of the railway line up Lapstone Hill was completed with a new double-tracked 1913 tunnel at the Bluff Point. The old 1892 Glenbrook Tunnel was subsequently closed. As a result of the new line, the Old Glenbrook station was relocated from next to the Great Western Highway to its current location next to the village of Glenbroook at the end of Ross Street, and was officially opened 11 May 1913.

The abandoned 1892 Glenbrook Tunnel has been used to store mustard gas during World War II, and grow mushrooms in recent times. The eastern entrance can be still seen from a walking track at Lapstone.

On 28 January 1941, an Avro Anson of No. 1 Air Navigation School, Parkes crashed near Glenbrook during a medical evacuation flight from Parkes to the Sydney Airport. All five crew members were killed.

In 1999, the town was associated with the Glenbrook train disaster.

Since 2005, the suburb has been the home of The Australian Gnome Convention organised by the Rotary Club of Lower Blue Mountains and held on Australia Day each year. Owners of garden gnomes display their garden decorations and compete for various awards to raise funds for charities.

Heritage listings

New South Wales State Heritage Register 
Glenbrook has a number of heritage-listed sites, including the following items listed on the New South Wales State Heritage Register:
 Blue Mountains National Park: Blue Mountains walking tracks
 15-17 Great Western Highway: Knapsack Gully Viaduct, 1865
 78 Great Western Highway: Glenbrook railway residence
 Great Western Highway: 1892 Glenbrook Tunnel
 Mitchells Pass: Lennox Bridge, Glenbrookthe oldest surviving stone arch bridge in mainland Australia

City of Blue Mountains local government heritage register 

Glenbrook has a number of heritage-listed sites, including the following items listed on the City of Blue Mountains local government heritage register, as recorded in the New South Wales Heritage Database:

 Blue Mountains National Park: Red Hand Cave
 67 Brook Road: The Bluff 
 Burfitt Parade: Glenbrook railway station
 2 Cross Street: House
 15 Euroka Road: Thurso
 26 Explorers Road: House
 175 Explorers Road: The Spurline
 Great Western Highway: Glenbrook Deviation (1913)
 2 Great Western Highway: Gatekeeper's Cottage No 1
 2 Great Western Highway: Whitton Memorial
 15 Great Western Highway: Glenbrook Deviation (1892)
 15-17 Great Western Highway: Lapstone Zig Zag
 29 Great Western Highway: Briarcliffe (now RAAF Base Glenbrook)
 29 Great Western Highway: Former Lapstone Hotel (now RAAF Base Glenbrook)
 41 Great Western Highway: Blaxland, Wentworth and Lawson Memorial
 41 Great Western Highway: Glenbrook Native Plant Reserve
 41 Great Western Highway: Original Glenbrook Railway Sign and Monument
 12 Hare Street: Glenbrook School of Music
 Off Knapsack Street: Lucasville Station
 15-19 Lagoon Drive: Glenbrook Lagoon
 33 Lucasville Road: Phoenix Palm Group
 37 Lucasville Road: Kalamunda
 2 Mann Street: House
 9 Mann Street: House 
 33 Moore Street: Bonnie Doone
 6 Nepean Gardens Place: Ulinbawn
 4 Park Street: Serendip
 6 Park Street: Glenbrook Cottage
 10 Park Street: Glenbrook Primary School
 10 Park Street: The Warruwii Centre – Building B00A
 20-30 Park Street: Glenbrook Park
 23-29 Park Street: Green Real Estate
 41 Park Street: Briar Hill
 51 Park Street: "Girrahween"
 2 Ross Street: Horse Trough
 20 Ross Street: Glenbrook Garden Centre
 6 Raymond Street: House
 8 Raymond Street: House
 6 Wascoe Street: House
 8 Wascoe Street: Ilford, house and garden
 9 Waters Road: Arcadia

Population
In the 2016 Census, there were 5,051 people in Glenbrook. 82.0% of people were born in Australia. The next most common country of birth was England at 5.4%. 90.9% of people spoke only English at home. The most common responses for religion were No Religion 31.5%, Catholic 24.5% and Anglican 18.7%.

Transport
Glenbrook railway station is on the Blue Mountains Line of the NSW TrainLink intercity network. Also, the Great Western Highway passes through the town.

Landmarks
 Two fire brigade stations, one which falls under the jurisdiction of the volunteer Rural Fire Service as well as a 'retained' New South Wales Fire Brigades station (station 301)
 Glenbrook Cinema
 Glenbrook Cottage (1916), Park Street (heritage-listed)
 Glenbrook Oval
 Glenbrook Park (1884) and stone gate are heritage-listed
 Glenbrook Stone Suburb Staircase
 Glenbrook Swim Centre
 Knapsack Oval
 Mount Sion Park
 Sir Douglas Smith Park
 Wascoe Siding Train Park
 Whitton Park

Gallery

Recreation
Founded in 1975, Lapstone Glenbrook Netball Club was formed from a merger between what was St Peter's Netball Club and school-based teams at Lapstone Public School and Glenbrook Public School. St Peter's Netball Club was a founding club of the Blue Mountains Netball Association and was run from the church organisation previously based in the St Peter's Anglican Church building which is now used as a cafe in Glenbrook). Netball is currently the largest participation sport in the Blue Mountains and all matches are played at the Lapstone complex.

Other sporting clubs in the area include:
 The Glenbrook Swimming Club
 The Glenbrook/Blaxland Cricket Club
 The Blue Mountains Football Club
 The Glenbrook Panthers Bowling Club

Other non-sporting club based recreational activities include:

 Jellybean Pool/Glenbrook Gorge/Blue Pool, entered via the national park (generally free entry on weekdays)
 Endpoint of the Oaks Firetrail, a popular off-road bike route between Woodford and Glenbrook
 Camping at Euroka Clearing where kangaroos can be seen at all times of the day and year (especially summer)
 Bushwalking: Via Euroka Clearing to the Nepean River, Via Evans Track to Warragamba Dam
 Glenbrook Cinema (one of three in the Blue Mountains)
 Glenbrook Swimming Centre (also considered to be in Blaxland)

See also
 List of Blue Mountains articles

References

 Aston, N. (1988) Rails, Roads & Ridges: History of Lapstone Hill-Glenbrook. Glenbrook Public School Centenary Committee.

External links

 Blue Mountains National Park – Glenbrook – attractions and walks
 More Glenbrook Information
 Glenbrook Chamber of Commerce 

 
Towns in New South Wales